Philipp Eberhard Hermann Kohlschreiber (born 16 October 1983) is a German former professional tennis player. The right-hander won eight singles and seven doubles titles on the ATP World Tour and made the quarterfinals at the 2012 Wimbledon Championships. He reached his highest ATP singles ranking of world No. 16 in July 2012.

Personal life
Kohlschreiber married his long-term girlfriend Lena Alberti on 1 August 2018 in Kitzbühel, Austria.

Career

2007: First ATP career title
In 2007, Kohlschreiber achieved his greatest result at an ATP Masters Series event during the Monte-Carlo Masters, when he reached the quarterfinals after going through qualifying, defeating world No. 12 David Nalbandian in the second round. He won his first career title in Munich defeating Mikhail Youzhny, thereby becoming the first German player to win the event since Michael Stich in 1994.

2008: Four top-ten victories
Kohlschreiber started 2008 by reaching the quarterfinals of the tournament in Doha and winning his second career title in Auckland, where he defeated Juan Carlos Ferrero in the final.

After his win in Auckland, he defeated world No. 6, Andy Roddick, in the third round of the Australian Open 6–4, 3–6, 7–6, 6–7, 8–6. Kohlschreiber hit a personal record 32 aces and 104 winners. He eventually lost in the fourth round to Jarkko Nieminen 6–3, 6–7, 6–7, 3–6. Kohlschreiber failed to convert 11 set points in the second (7) and third (4) sets.

He reached the final of the Gerry Weber Open in Halle, Germany, eventually falling to the four-time champion Roger Federer 3–6, 4–6. At the US Open, he had to retire in the match against Viktor Troicki.

2009: 4th round at the French Open

Kohlschreiber started 2009 by reaching the quarterfinals in Doha and Auckland. The German reached the second round at the Australian Open where he defeated Sam Querrey, before losing to Fabrice Santoro in five sets. In the BNP Paribas Open in Indian Wells, Kohlschreiber beat Nicolás Lapentti 6–2, 3–6, 6–3 before being defeated by Fernando Verdasco in the fourth round. Also in 2009, during the French Open, Kohlschreiber defeated world No. 4, Novak Djokovic, in a 6–4, 6–4, 6–4 upset.

In the third round of Wimbledon, he was defeated by Roger Federer 6–3, 6–2, 6–7, 6–1. He was the only person other than finalist Andy Roddick to take a set off of Federer, the eventual champion.

2010: Quarterfinals in Monte Carlo and Canada Masters
Kohlschreiber started the season in Auckland well with three straight sets wins, including wins over Thomaz Bellucci and Frenchman Marc Gicquel before running into eventual finalist Arnaud Clément, losing in straight sets in the semifinals. Kohlschreiber progressed to the third round of the Australian Open with wins over Horacio Zeballos and Wayne Odesnik. He gave second seed Rafael Nadal a test in the third round, before losing 4–6, 2–6, 6–2, 5–7.

He returned to action in San Jose seeing off local boy Rajeev Ram in three sets and crushing Dudi Sela, only losing two games. He then ran into the in-form Denis Istomin and lost in three topsy sets, sparking a three-match losing streak. He crashed out of Memphis to Evgeny Korolev in two tight sets, followed by an easy three set lost to Gaël Monfils in the Davis Cup.

Kohlschreiber got back to winning ways at the BNP Paribas Open in Indian Wells as he had a bye then beat fellow German Philipp Petzschner in straight sets. He then lost a final set tie-breaker in round 3 to world No. 2, Djokovic. At the Sony Ericsson Open Kohlschreiber received another bye and took on fellow German Florian Mayer and it was about to go into a first set tie breaker before Florian retired with an injury. Again he went out in the third round this time to Jo-Wilfried Tsonga in straight sets.

To start his clay-court season, Kohlschreiber went to the Monte-Carlo Masters where he caused a couple of upsets. In the first round, he edged out Bellucci in a final set tie-break before he thumped the world No. 4, Andy Murray, for the loss of just three games. He then took on Petzschner, again and again, won in straight sets, to reach the quarterfinals. Where he played David Ferrer and was edged out in two tight sets.

At Wimbledon, Kohlschreiber defeated Potito Starace and Teymuraz Gabashvili, before losing to Andy Roddick in the third round.
At Hamburg, he lost to Thomaz Bellucci in the third round. In September, he hired Murray's former coach Miles Maclagan.

2011: Grand Slam struggles
Kohlschreiber began his year at the Qatar Open where he was the eighth seed. He won his first match against Andreas Seppi 6–2, 6–4 but then lost to Ivo Karlović in a tight match 7–6, 6–7, 7–6. He then went to the Heineken Open in Auckland where he won against Carlos Berlocq 2–6, 6–3, 6–1, and 6–4, 3–6, 6–2 against Marcel Granollers before falling to the top seed David Ferrer, 3–6, 7–6, 3–6, in the quarterfinals.
In February, Kohlschreiber attended the ABN AMRO tournament in Rotterdam. In the first round, he faced Lu Yen-hsun of Taiwan whom he defeated 6–4, 7–6. In the second round, he put up a brave showing against top seed and world No. 4, Robin Söderling, but lost 6–3, 5–7, 7–6.
In the first round of the Davis Cup tie against Croatia, Kohlschreiber saved one match point in the second rubber against Ivan Dodig to win in five sets and to draw the score after day one. In the fourth rubber, Marin Čilić was too strong for Kohlschreiber – he was defeated in straight sets to give the tie a 2–2. In the deciding fifth rubber Philipp Petzschner managed to lead Germany to a 3–2 win. After a first round bye in Indian Wells, Kohlschreiber defeated Tim Smyczek in Round two saving 3 MP before beating world No. 4, Robin Söderling, 7–6, 6–4, saving five set points in the opening set tie-break. In round 4, he lost to Juan Martín del Potro, 6–7, 6–7. Kohlschreiber was defeated by Federer in the second round of the Monte-Carlo Masters after beating Andrey Golubev in round 1.
He captured his third career title at the Gerry Weber Open in Halle defeating Philipp Petzschner in the final. On the way to the title, he overcame Cedrik-Marcel Stebe, Alexandr Dolgopolov, Lleyton Hewitt and Gaël Monfils.

2012: Quarterfinals at Wimbledon
At the Australian Open he lost in the fourth round to Juan Martín del Potro. Kohlschreiber reached the semifinals of Gerry Weber Open, defeating Rafael Nadal in the quarterfinals, 6–3, 6–4. He lost in the semifinals to Tommy Haas, 6–7, 5–7.

Less than two weeks following his defeat of Nadal, Kohlschreiber beat Tommy Haas, Malek Jaziri and then Lukáš Rosol in straight sets 6–2, 6–3, 7–6 in the third round of Wimbledon Championships. Rosol had defeated Nadal in the previous round of in one of the greatest upsets in Grand Slam history. Kohlschreiber then advanced to the quarterfinals of a major for the first time by defeating Brian Baker, but was thwarted by Jo-Wilfried Tsonga 7–6, 4–6, 7–6, 6–2. At the US Open, he lost in the fourth round to Janko Tipsarević.

2013: 4th round at the French Open and US Open

At the Australian Open, he lost in the third round to Milos Raonic. He made it to the fourth round of the French Open before losing to world number one, Novak Djokovic. At Wimbledon, he had to retire in his first-round match against Ivan Dodig. At the US Open, he lost in the fourth round to eventual champion Rafael Nadal.

2014: Davis Cup quarterfinals
At the 2014 Rotterdam Open, Kohlschreiber defeated Richard Gasquet to reach quarterfinals, where he lost to Igor Sijsling. At Dubai, he won over Andreas Seppi in the second round and was defeated by Tomáš Berdych in the semifinals.

Kohlschreiber won the Düsseldorf Open, then the following week reached the third round of the French Open where he took reigning Wimbledon champion Andy Murray to five sets.

At Hamburg, he reached the semifinals winning over Gilles Simon and Lukáš Rosol. At the US Open, he defeated John Isner in the third round and lost to Djokovic in the round of 16.

2015: Title in Kitzbühel
Kohlschreiber defeated Paul-Henri Mathieu in the first round of the Australian Open in straight sets for his first win of the season, before bowing out to Bernard Tomic in a tightly contested four-set match, 7–6, 4–6, 6–7, 6–7. He was very dominant against Japanese Go Soeda to begin the French Open, losing only three games, but could not get past Pablo Andújar despite winning sets three and four. He fell to Djokovic with a score of 4–6, 4–6, 4–6 in the first round of Wimbledon. Kohlschreiber then took part in Kitzbühel, defeating two top-30 players in Fabio Fognini and Dominic Thiem in the quarter- and semifinals, respectively. He then defeated Paul-Henri Mathieu to win the tournament. The US Open saw his best grand slam performance of the year, defeating countryman Alexander Zverev in five sets, and then taking down Lukas Rosol with a score of 7–6, 6–2, 6–2. Federer took down Kohlschreiber in straights in the third round, however.

2016: Munich champion, Stuttgart runner-up, poor Grand Slam results
Kohlschreiber began 2016 ranked 34th in the world and had a season high rank of 22. He lost in the first round of the Australian Open to Kei Nishikori in straight sets. He played in the Sofia Open and lost to Victor Troicki in the quarterfinals. His next tournament was the Rotterdam Open where Kohlschreiber beat former US Open champion Marin Cilic in the quarterfinals. He then lost in the next round. Following the Rotterdam semifinals, Kohlschreiber made the quarterfinals of Dubai where he lost to Stan Wawrinka. Kohlschreiber then represented Germany in their Davis Cup team against the Czech Republic where he beat both Lukáš Rosol and Tomáš Berdych.

Kohlschreiber reached the round of 32 at both the Indian Wells Masters and the Monte-Carlo Masters where he lost to Djokovic and Wawrinka, respectively. He reached the semifinals in Barcelona before winning the Munich Open with wins against Mayer, del Potro, Fognini and Dominic Thiem in the final. He lost early at both Madrid Masters and the Rome Masters before a first-round loss at the French Open to Nicolás Almagro.

2017: 400th win, best Grand Slam fourth round result since 2014
Kohlschreiber started 2017 ranked No. 32. At the Australian Open, he won against Nikoloz Basilashvili and Donald Young, but lost in round 3 to Gael Monfils.  
In February, Kohlschreiber played in the Dubai Tennis Championships where he beat eighth seed Gilles Muller in straight sets. In the quarterfinals, Kohlschreiber who was aiming to win his 400th match on tour lost in three tight sets to eventual champion and world No. 1, Andy Murray. Kohlschreiber won the first set 7–6, and in the second set tiebreaker lost 18–20. In that tiebreaker, Kohlschreiber had seven match points. Murray saved all seven, won the tiebreaker and the deciding set 6–1.

Kohlschreiber finally won his 400th match at the BNP Paribas Open against Alexandr Dolgopolov. He subsequently lost his next match to eventual finalist Stan Wawrinka. Later that month at the Miami Open, as the 26th seed, Kohlschreiber won his second-round match in three sets against young American Taylor Fritz. In the third round, despite winning the first set 6–0, Kohlschreiber lost to 15 time Grand Slam champion Rafael Nadal. In August, Kohlschreiber won his second title at Kitzbuhel.

Originally for the US Open, Kohlschreiber was to be unseeded; however, the last-minute withdrawal of Andy Murray saw a draw reshuffle with Kohlschreiber becoming the 33rd seed. Kohlschreiber reached the round of 16 where he lost to Roger Federer, world No. 3, in straight sets. Kohlschreiber did not drop a set in reaching the round of 16.

2018: Masters 1000 - singles quarterfinal since 2010, first doubles semifinal; fifth US Open fourth round

2019–2021: 2019 year-end loss of form; continued struggles in 2020; out of top 100 in 2021
Kohlschreiber won his first match against a current world No. 1 at the 2019 Indian Wells Masters, where he beat Novak Djokovic in the third round in straight sets. He lost in the next round against Gaël Monfils.

After an extended period of playing on the Challenger tour, winning the 2020 Canberra Challenger, he struggled with form and was not able to pass the first round in multiple Grand Slams, except for the 2020 Australian Open where he withdrew in the second round,  Kohlschreiber found his form at the 2021 French Open using his protected ranking where he reached the third round of this major for the first time in seven years, since 2014. He defeated Fernando Verdasco and 24th seed Aslan Karatsev before falling to 10th seed and 2020 French Open semifinalist Diego Schwartzman.

He lost in the first round at the 2021 Wimbledon Championships to Denis Shapovalov, where he also used his protected ranking, after a hard-fought five setter lasting more than  hours.

At the 2021 US Open Kohlschreiber reached the second round, using his protected ranking once more, after Marin Cilic retired in the first round in the fifth set. It was Cilic's first retirement in more than 800 matches on the tour.

2022: 68th Grand Slam appearance, out of top 200, retirement
He competed in his 68th Grand Slam at the Australian Open and reached the second round.
Unable to defend his third round showing at Roland Garros from the year before, and despite qualifying at Indian Wells earlier in the season, he fell out of the top 150 on 6 June 2022. On 20 June, after winning the first round of the Wimbledon qualifying, he announced his retirement from professional tennis after that tournament. He played his last match on the ATP Tour two days later, losing to Mikhail Kukushkin in the next round. 
As of 27 June 2022, he is in 4th place on the list of Grand Slam appearances overall with 68 tied with Novak Djokovic.

Performance timelines

Singles

 Kohlschreiber's second-round match at the 2013 French Open was a walkover (so doesn't count as a win).
 Kohlschreiber withdrew before the second round match at the 2020 Australian Open due to an injury (so doesn't count as a loss).

Doubles

ATP career finals

Singles: 18 (8 titles, 10 runner-ups)

Doubles: 10 (7 titles, 3 runner-ups)

Team competition: 2 (1 title, 1 runner-up)

ATP Challenger and ITF Futures finals

Singles: 10 (5–5)

Doubles: 1 (1–0)

Playing style
Kohlschreiber is an all-court player with an emphasis on baseline play. He has strong groundstrokes on both wings which are equally as solid and is often able to wrong-foot opponents due to his quick follow-through, forcing them to commit early. His forehand is his primary weapon, and he is known to hit inside-out forehands to draw opponents out, while his single-handed backhand is considered one of the best on the tour currently. It is known for its consistency, power, and his ability to hit it in a variety of ways, namely flat, with top-spin and slice. Generally playing from the baseline, Kohlschreiber constructs points and uses a sudden injection of pace or a drop-shot to draw opponents out of their comfort zone and dominate the point from there.

Complementing his strong baseline play, as an all-court player, Kohlschreiber is also a proficient volleyer and uses variety to construct points. He is known to employ drop-shots mid-rally to catch opponents off-guard, especially on the backhand side. He occasionally uses a chip-and-charge tactic as well, especially on grass. It is due to the variety of shots he has that has led him to be successful on all surfaces, as can be seen by the fact that he has reached at least the fourth round of all Grand Slam tournaments and won titles on all surfaces (although he has won the most titles on clay).

Wins over top 10 players
 He has a  record against players who were, at the time the match was played, ranked in the top 10.

Record against top 10 players
Kohlschreiber's ATP-only record against players who have been ranked world No. 10 or higher. 
 ''Statistics correct .

German tournaments

References

External links

 
 
 

1983 births
Living people
German male tennis players
Olympic tennis players of Germany
Tennis players at the 2016 Summer Olympics
Tennis players at the 2020 Summer Olympics
Hopman Cup competitors
Sportspeople from Augsburg
German expatriate sportspeople in Austria
Tennis people from Bavaria